Raghu Ram Ambadapudi (born 15 April 1975) is an Indian television producer and actor. He was a senior supervising producer at MTV India and the creator of reality television shows MTV Roadies, MTV Dropout Pvt Ltd and MTV Splitsvilla. He was married to actress Sugandha Garg. He has a twin brother, Rajiv Lakshman who worked with him on MTV Roadies. The brothers launched their own content studio called Monozygotic Solutions Pvt. Ltd in 2014.

Early life 
Raghu Ram was born in Machilipatnam, Andhra Pradesh, along with his twin brother. His father is a chartered accountant and his mother is a journalist. Ram has a younger sister Supriya Nistala. 

In the first year, he was a student of Deshbandhu College, but in the second year, he joined Sri Venkateswara College. In the final year, he joined Osmania University in Hyderabad where he completed his graduation.

Career

Early career

Raghu Ram started his career at MTV India supervising shows including MTV Love Line with VJs Malaika Arora and Cyrus Broacha, and also spearheaded MTV Select and the first few seasons of MTV Super Select with VJ Nikhil Chinapa.

In 2004, Ram appeared in the first season of the reality tv show Indian Idol as a contestant with judges Anu Malik, Farah Khan and Sonu Nigam. He was rejected due to inefficient singing ability and signature attitude traits. He later explained in his autobiography that picking a fight with the judges was actually a prank he played, on the suggestion of one of his colleagues and his wife who were working there as moderators.

MTV India
His idea of MTV Roadies was accepted as an experimental project by MTV in 2000. The show was tentatively titled MTV: Find The Road, and was initially met with skepticism by the senior producers of the channel. It started to gain popularity from its second season onwards and went on to become the longest running reality show on Indian television. Ram was later appointed the senior supervising producer of MTV India and the executive producer of Roadies as well as MTV Splitsvilla, another reality show which he had launched in 2008.

In 2014, Ram announced that he wouldn't be attached with Roadies from season X2, after being associated with the show for 11 years. He said on Twitter, "Roadies is happening. I'm not gonna do it though. I'm done with it. Moved on. About time, too."

In April 2011, Ram, along with MTV Roadies co-hosts, his brother Rajiv and Rannvijay Singh, had to face a difficult situation in Pune when some activists of Akhil Bharatiya Vidyarthi Parishad (ABVP) tried to blacken their faces. This was for using foul language on national television while they were participating in a promotional rally in the city.

Ram wrote an autobiography titled Rearview: My Roadies Journey, published in 2013.

Post-Roadies
In April 2016, Ram launched a web series titled A.I.SHA My Virtual Girlfriend, a webcam fiction show, through the online content platform Arre.

In July 2017, Ram launched the reality show Dropout Pvt Ltd, where the contestants perform tasks to get their business acumen judged and form a startup. He also appeared in the controversial AIB knockout with Bollywood actors Ranveer Singh and Arjun Kapoor,  popular stand-up comedy group AIB, critic Rajeev Masand, comedian Aditi Mittal and comedian Abish Mathew. It was hosted by a Bollywood film producer Karan Johar.

Ram along with his brother have performed in the comedy series Comedy Nights Bachao on Colors TV. Raghu Ram has also performed in the comedy serial Entertainment Ki Raat.

In 2019, Ram and his brother Rajiv starred in Amazon Prime's 'Skulls and Roses'. The show received negative reviews and it was not continued for the second season.

Film career
Ram and his brother have acted in a few Bollywood films like Tees Maar Khan in 2010 along with Akshay Kumar as the Johari brothers, though the film didn't do well at the box office. In the same year, Ram also acted in Jhoota Hi Sahi with actor John Abraham. His acting was appreciated by critics. He was also nominated for the Best Singer Award at the GIMA Awards 2012 for his song "Manmani".He also acted in Tamil movie "Doctor".

Filmography
Tees Maar Khan
Jhootha Hi Sahi
Doctor (Tamil) as Melvin

Personal life
Raghuram was married to actress Sugandha Garg, who has played roles in Hindi films Jaane Tu... Ya Jaane Na, Tere Bin Laden and My Name Is Khan. In 2016, they announced their separation, after having been married for almost a decade. Their divorce was finalised in 2018.

In 2018, he married singer Natalie Di Luccio. On 8 January 2020, they had a son named Rhythm.

Book 
Raghu wrote a book on his life titled Rearview: My Roadies Journey which was published by Rupa Publications and was available in print from November 2013. The book talks about various phases of his life, from his childhood to being the judge on Roadies. He also talks about his love for music, brother Rajiv Lakshman and wife Sugandha. The book was well received by his fans and revealed quite a lot about him.

References

Bibliography

External links
 
 

1973 births
Identical twins
Indian game show hosts
Indian male film actors
Living people
Male actors from Andhra Pradesh
Male actors in Hindi cinema
People from Krishna district
Indian twins
Delhi University alumni
MTV people